Swadlincote is a former mining town in the district of South Derbyshire, England, lying within The National Forest area. It also covers Newhall, Oversetts, Midway and the villages of Church Gresley and Woodville, with the sub-district of Goseley. It has a population of some 36,000.

History
Swadlincote's name is derived from the Old English ,  being a man's name and  meaning cottages. Past forms of the name include Sivardingescote and Swartlincote. Local residents sometimes shorten its name to "Swad".

The Domesday Book of 1086 recorded Swadlincote as a small manor. It was part of the parish of Gresley (latterly Church Gresley) until the 19th century.

The first record of mineral extraction in the area is from the end of the 13th century, but the area remained rural until the industrialisation in the 18th century. The presence of coal and clay in the area led to urbanisation, as collieries, brickworks and potteries came to dominate. These industries continued to expand until the Second World War. One traditional bottle-shaped kiln survives in Alexandra Road.

The fire-clay strata in the coal measures has a high alumina content. Swadlincote is one of only six places in Britain with clay deposits of such quality. This makes it particularly suitable for salt glazing. The properties of the clay mean it is easily shaped into pipes that are resistant to sewage. The Public Health Act 1875 created a huge demand for locally produced pipes.

Emmanuel Church of England parish church is a Gothic Revival building consecrated in 1846, designed by Henry Isaac Stevens and completed in 1848. Swadlincote also had a Wesleyan chapel by then. Today the town has also the Roman Catholic church of Saints Peter and Paul.

The first local-government body for the town was Swadlincote District local board of health, formed in 1871. Its area consisted of three civil parishes: Church Gresley, Stanton and Newhall and Swadlincote. Under the Local Government Act 1894, this became Swadlincote and District Urban District, renamed Swadlincote Urban District in 1951. In 1974 the urban district was merged with Repton Rural District and part of South East Derbyshire Rural District to form the present South Derbyshire District.

The urban district council was granted a coat of arms in 1947, in a design that reflected how Swadlincote was formed of part of the ancient parish of Church Gresley. Round the edge of the shield was a bordure or border in a "vairy" pattern of red and ermine, from the arms of the Gresley family, who took their name from the parish. The dedication of Gresley parish church to Saint George and Saint Mary was represented by their symbols: a cross and a fleur de lys respectively. The quartered ermine and red field of the shield was taken from the arms of the Stanhope family, Earls of Harrington. The Tudor roses were taken from the arms of Derbyshire County Council. Above the arms was a crest depicting a human arm holding a billet or: a yellow brick for the local brick-making industry. The arm rose from flames, indicative of mining of fireclay and coal. The Latin motto adopted:  ("Riches from the earth") also referred to the mineral industries of Swadlincote. The current arms of South Derbyshire District Council, which bear the motto "The Earth Our Wealth" and also reflect this heritage.

Throughout the 1950s and 1960s the town's Rink venue (now demolished and the site of industrial units) hosted major British and American pop stars. Gene Vincent appeared on 7 September 1963, and Ringo Starr in 1962, while he was drummer for Rory Storm and the Hurricanes.

Governance
Swadlincote covers four of the 17 wards of South Derbyshire District, returning 11 of the 36 district councillors: Church Gresley (two councillors), Newhall and Stanton (three), Midway (three) and Swadlincote (three). Of the eleven elected in 2007, ten are Labour Party and one a Conservative.

Swadlincote forms part of the South Derbyshire parliamentary constituency. Between 1997 and 2010 its MP was Mark Todd (Labour). In the 2010 General Election, the seat was won by the Conservative Party candidate Heather Wheeler, an ex-leader of the Conservative group on South Derbyshire District Council. A notable previous MP is Edwina Currie (Conservative). Until 1983 the area was part of the Belper constituency.

Geography
The town is located within the Leicestershire and South Derbyshire Coalfield. Its landscape is marked by shallow valleys and ridges, shaped particularly by the mining activity which once dominated the area. Swadlincote lies within the National Forest, and there has been significant tree planting around Gresley Common, Swadlincote Woodlands and Church Gresley.

The suburbs of Newhall and Stanton to the north-west lie along the Burton upon Trent and Swadlincote Green Belt, as a curb to development which could have caused Swadlincote to merge with the Winshill and Stapenhill districts of Burton-on-Trent. Most of the green belt lies in Derbyshire, with small tracts in Staffordshire. Hence most of Swadlincote's 21st-century expansion has been to the south and east of the centre, particularly adjacent to Woodville and Church Gresley.

Swadlincote is encircled by several villages and hamlets including Hartshorne, Albert Village, Blackfordby, Overseal, Moira, Linton, Boundary, Norris Hill and Spring Cottage.

Economy
The town originally had a prominent manufacturing heritage that made pipes and earthenware. It was the centre of the South Derbyshire coalfield, but mining ceased when Rawdon Colliery closed in 1993. Light manufacturing and service companies are sited on large industrial estates.

Swadlincote has a moderate-sized town centre typical of the Midlands, containing national chain stores and small local businesses. It had a branch of Somerfield before the Co-operative Group took over the chain in 2009. The opening of a large chain supermarket on Coppice Side has been blamed as a factor behind the closure of several small independent shops. The shops that lined West Street and High Street from 1901 had disappeared by the early 21st century. Hepworth Retail Park is a modern development with a restaurant, cinema and various shops.

Plans were announced in 2008 for a new retail complex consisting of a cinema, DIY store and a nationally recognised clothing store. A link road called Sir Herbert Wragg Way has been built, named after the area's mid-20th century Member of Parliament and pipe-yard owner.

A pub bar and restaurant opened on the former Empire Cinema site in April 2007, named The Paramount after Paramount Cars, a manufacturer based in the town in the 1950s. The pub closed in June 2013.

Transport
Swadlincote is near the junction of the A514 (Derby to A444) and A511 (Burton-upon-Trent to Ashby-de-la-Zouch) roads.

In 1804 the Ashby Canal opened, with its northern terminus at Moira, Leicestershire. Also built were tramways to carry coal and ceramics from Swadlincote and elsewhere to the canal for shipment.

The Midland Railway opened its Leicester to Burton upon Trent Line in 1845, with Gresley railway station to serve the area. It later built a branch with two stations, at Swadlincote itself and neighbouring Woodville. Passenger services on the branch ended in 1947. The Leicester to Burton Line, via Gresley, remains open for goods traffic and in the 1990s there were plans to restart the passenger service as the second phase of Leicestershire's Ivanhoe Line. This plan was shelved after the privatisation of British Rail, and Swadlincote remains one of the UK's largest towns without a railway station.

Swadlincote is served by the Arriva Midlands and Diamond East Midlands bus companies.

Swadlincote is on National Cycle Network Route 63. Though currently under development, it is signed from Civic Way through to Church Gresley via Maurice Lea Park with links onward to the heart of the National Forest.

Education
Schools in Swadlincote include Granville Academy at Woodville, William Allitt School at Newhall, St George's School and Pennine Way Junior Academy in Church Gresley, Belmont and Springfield Junior Schools and The Pingle Academy on Coronation Street, which with 1,200 pupils is Swadlincote's largest secondary school.

The closest university is the University of Derby, 18 miles (29 km) to the north, with Staffordshire University's Lichfield campus an equal distance to the south-west.

Amenities

The main attractions in Swadlincote are local parks, such as Maurice Lea at Church Gresley and Eureka, Green Bank Leisure Centre, a large dry ski slope, and a '50s American Diner, said to be the largest such establishment in the UK. All are within easy reach of the town centre.

Swadlincote Woodlands Forest Park is an 80-acre site, with more than 40,000 trees, two recreational forest trails and has a number of view points across the town. It is also the proposed site for the Pipeworks arts and media project, a charity-based community theatre and media production facility.

The town's one museum is the Sharpe's Pottery Museum, devoted to the town's ceramic heritage. It contains a café and the town's Tourist Information Centre is based there.

Gresley Rovers is a semi-professional association football team based at Moat Street, Church Gresley.

Local youth organisations include No. 1211 (Swadlincote) Squadron of the Air Training Corps based in Eureka Park.

Accent and dialect
The area around Swadlincote has historically had a distinct dialect. It shares terms and pronunciations common in Burton-upon-Trent (West Midlands) and Derby (East Midlands).

Recently, people have been moving to the town from Staffordshire (Tamworth, Rugeley, Lichfield, etc.), who use Swadlincote as a dormitory site, working elsewhere. This West Midlands accent can be heard alongside the traditional one.

Notable people
In birth order:

George Stanhope (1660–1728), royal chaplain and promoter of church building, was born at Hartshorne near Swadlincote.
Henry Isaac Stevens (1806–1873), architect, designed Emmanuel Church in Swadlincote.
George Lloyd (1820–1885), archaeologist and cleric, was curate of Church Gresley in the 1860s.
Helen Allingham (née Paterson, 1848–1926), water colourist and illustrator, was born to a Swadlincote doctor's family.
J. Thomas Looney, (1870–1944), scholar who advanced the "Oxford wrote Shakespeare" theory, died in Swadlincote.
George H. Widdows (1881–1976), schools architect, designed the Grade II listed Springfield Junior School in Swadlincote.
John Hurt (1940–2017), actor, lived in Woodville while aged five to twelve. His father was Vicar of St Stephen's parish church.
John Bloor (born 1943), owner of Bloor Homes and Triumph Motorcycles Ltd
Joe Jackson (born 1954), jazz-rock musician and singer-songwriter, spent the first year of his life in Swadlincote.
Andrew Bridgen (born 1964), Conservative politician, attended The Pingle School in Swadlincote.

Sports
John Hulme (1862–1940), county cricketer, was born in Church Gresley.
Arthur Archer (1874–1940), professional footballer, played also for Swadlincote Town FC.
Ben Warren (1879–1917), England international footballer, was born in Newhall.
John Heath (1891–1972), was a first-class and international cricketer born in Swadlincote.
George Harrison (1892–1939), professional footballer and publican, was born and died in Church Gresley.
Frederick Heath (1894–1967), first-class cricketer, was born in Swadlincote.
Lew Bradford (1916–1984), professional footballer, was born in Swadlincote.
Douglas Meakin (1929–1998), first-class cricketer
Bobby Mason (born 1936), professional footballer, lives in Swadlincote.
Alan Arthur Jackson (born 1938), professional footballer and schoolteacher, was born in Swadlincote.
Jack Bodell (1940–2016), British heavyweight boxing champion, was born in Newhall.
Luke Simpkin (born 1979), is a Swadlincote-based light heavyweight professional boxer.
Marc Goodfellow (born 1981), professional footballer, was born in Swadlincote.
Carl Dickinson (born 1987) is a Swadlincote-born professional footballer playing for Yeovil Town.
Harry Ward (born 1997), professional darts player, was born in Swadlincote.
Lewis White (born 2000), Paralympic, S9 swimming champion, was born in Swadlincote.

See also
Listed buildings in Swadlincote

Notes

Sources

External links

 
Towns in Derbyshire
Unparished areas in Derbyshire
South Derbyshire District